The Universal Masters Collection is a mid-price compilation of recordings by Grace Jones, first released by Universal Music in 2003.

Background
With the exception of "La Vie en rose" from the 1977 album Portfolio, the 13-track package focuses on material from Jones' Compass Point trilogy: Warm Leatherette (1980), Nightclubbing (1981), and Living My Life (1982). Included in the booklet is an essay by Daryl Easlea, which incorrectly states Jones' birth year.

The album was later re-released a number of times by Universal with the same track listing, but alternate covers and new titles. 2005 saw the release of Best 1200 on the Japanese market. Colour Collection, released in 2006, used the Living My Life picture on its cover, while the German pressing Star-Club präsentiert Grace Jones (2008) recycled the Nightclubbing cover art. In 2008 the album was re-issued as Classic Grace Jones.

Track listing
 "Private Life" - 5:10
 "Inspiration" - 4:34
 "Warm Leatherette" - 4:25
 "Pull Up to the Bumper" - 4:30
 "Love Is the Drug" - 7:15
 "Nightclubbing" - 5:05
 "Nipple to the Bottle" - 5:55
 "Breakdown" - 5:30
 "Demolition Man" - 4:00
 "La Vie en rose" - 7:27
 "My Jamaican Guy" - 6:00
 "Walking in the Rain" - 4:18
 "I've Seen That Face Before (Libertango)" - 4:28

Release history

References

External links
 The Universal Masters Collection on Allmusic
 The Universal Masters Collection on Discogs
 The Universal Masters Collection on Rate Your Music

2003 compilation albums
Grace Jones compilation albums